José Varela may refer to:

José Pedro Varela (1845-1879), Uruguayan politician
José Pedro Varela, Uruguay, small Uruguayan city named after the politician
José Gregorio Valera, Venezuelan president from 1878 to 1879
José Enrique Varela (1891–1951), Spanish military commander
José Luis Varela Lagunas (born 1946), Mexican politician
José Varela Fernández (born 1954), Puerto Rican politician
José Luis Varela (born 1978), Venezuelan boxer
José Varela (cyclist) (born 1984), Costa Rican cyclist
José Varela (footballer) (born 1997), Cape Verdean footballer